Jake the Snake may refer to:

Jacques Plante (1929-1986), Canadian hockey player
Jake Plummer (born 1974), American football player
Jake Roberts (born 1955), American professional wrestler